The Painted Lady is a 1912 American short drama film directed by  D. W. Griffith and starring Blanche Sweet. A print of the film survives.

Plot
The story as told by The Moving Picture News reads:

Cast

See also
 Harry Carey filmography
 D. W. Griffith filmography
 Lillian Gish filmography
 Blanche Sweet filmography
 Lionel Barrymore filmography

References

External links

The Painted Lady available for free download(archive.org)

1912 films
1912 drama films
1912 short films
American black-and-white films
Silent American drama films
American silent short films
Biograph Company films
Films directed by D. W. Griffith
1910s American films
1910s English-language films
American drama short films